This is the complete list of Pan American Games medalists in men's athletics from 1951 to 2019.

Events

100 metres

200 metres

400 metres

800 metres

1,500 metres

5,000 metres

10,000 metres

Marathon

110 metres hurdles

400 metres hurdles

3000 metre steeplechase

10,000 metres track walk

20km road walk

50km road walk

4 × 100 metres relay

4 × 400 metres relay

High jump

Pole vault

Long jump

Triple jump

Shot put

Discus throw

Hammer throw

Javelin throw

Decathlon

References

External links
Pan American Games medal winners up to 2003

Pan American Games
Pan American Games
Athletics